Gilly is a fictional character in the A Song of Ice and Fire series of fantasy novels by American author George R. R. Martin, and its television adaptation Game of Thrones.

Introduced in 1998's A Clash of Kings, she is a wildling from the wild lands north of the Wall who is befriended by Samwell Tarly and Jon Snow. She subsequently appeared in Martin's A Storm of Swords (2000), A Feast for Crows (2005), A Dance with Dragons (2011), and will appear in the upcoming novel The Winds of Winter.

Gilly is portrayed by Hannah Murray in the HBO television adaptation.

Character description
Gilly is a wildling girl, daughter and wife of Craster. She is in her late teens, has brown eyes and is estimated to be around 15 or 16 years old when she first appears in the novel.

Gilly is not a point of view character in the novels, so her actions are witnessed and interpreted mainly through the eyes of her romantic interest Samwell Tarly, as well as other people like Jon Snow and briefly Bran Stark.

Storylines
On Jeor Mormont's ranging, the Night's Watch stops at Craster's Keep, where Gilly encounters and befriends Samwell Tarly. After the Night's Watch regroups at Craster's Keep, Gilly gives birth to a son. Craster is killed before he can sacrifice the child, and in the confusion Gilly flees south with Samwell. In A Feast for Crows, she is sent South aboard a ship to Oldtown with Samwell, ostensibly with her child; in truth Jon Snow swapped her child with that of Mance Rayder, to spare the innocent child from Melisandre's flames on account of his king's blood.

TV adaptation

Gilly is played by English actress Hannah Murray in the television adaption of the series of books.

In an interview, Murray spoke about Gilly's relationship with Sam. Murray stated, "A big thing that connects them is having horrible fathers. We haven't seen Sam's father, but we know about that in a different way from Gilly, Sam was abused as well." She continued, "She knows that he loves her and she definitely loves him, but she's not someone who can process her emotions very well or has a sophisticated language for them. I've thought for a long time that they are like this little, unconventional family. He loves the baby as much as she does. Jon has said, 'Sam couldn't love it any more if it was his own.'"

In another interview, Murray spoke about her fellow castmember John Bradley, who plays her lover Sam and also about other castmembers on the show, saying "I’m really good friends with John, and I also have friends who I was friends with before we started the show. I did Skins with Joe Dempsie. My friend Jacob Anderson plays Grey Worm — we used to live together.  We shared a flat with another actor.  I think we were still living together when Jacob got the part, and I was so happy he was going to join."

Season 2 
A young wildling girl who lives north of the Wall, Gilly is one of many daughters of Craster, a wildling who takes all his daughters as wives once they grow up into women. She has a son with her father Craster. Samwell falls for her and becomes protective of her.

Season 3 
After Craster is killed and Commander Mormont's rangers turn on each other, Samwell runs with Gilly and her son to Castle Black. Along their journey, Gilly becomes fascinated with Samwell over his knowledge and his bravery of defending her son from a White Walker. After the three of them manage to reach Castle Black, Maester Aemon allows Gilly and her son to stay with them. In gratitude for Samwell helping them, Gilly names her son after Sam.

Season 4 
Gilly settles in a nearby inn close to Castle Black, with Sam's assistance. The inn is later attacked by wildlings, but Gilly hides with her son. They are found by Ygritte, who spares them. They make it back to Castle Black safely, where Sam hides them in the food storage, and kisses Gilly for the first time in case he dies. She is also visibly surprised when Janos Slynt hides in the food storage as well. Gilly remains unharmed throughout the battle, and reunites with Sam in the aftermath.

Season 5 
She expresses concern of being sent away or executed if Ser Alliser Thorne becomes the new Lord Commander. She is later present at Mance Rayder's execution. Gilly has begun to learn letters from Princess Shireen Baratheon, with Samwell watching over the two. Gilly also reveals to Shireen that she had sisters that also had Greyscale, but they were quarantined away from the other women at Craster's Keep and eventually succumbed to the disease. After Maester Aemon's death, during Jon's absence in Hardhome, she is almost sexually assaulted by two members of the Watch, but is saved by Sam and Ghost, after which she willingly makes love to him. She and her baby later leave Castle Black for Oldtown with Sam on Jon Snow's orders.

Season 6 
Along the way, they stop at Horn Hill, where Sam initially intends to leave Gilly and the baby with his family, but despite Randyll Tarly allowing them to stay, Sam decides to take them with him to the Citadel in Oldtown. In the sixth-season finale, they arrive.

Season 7 
While Sam is in the Citadel in Oldtown, trying to know more about how to defeat the White Walkers, she stays with him. While he is transcribing papers in his quarters, Gilly discovers that Rhaegar Targaryen (which she mispronounced as "Ragger") had his marriage to Elia Martell annulled and married another woman in secret, but Sam does not realize the significance of this information due to the mispronounciation. Later, because Gilly is tired of not being taken seriously, she and her baby leave Oldtown with Sam.

Season 8 
When Sam and Gilly arrive at Winterfell in the season finale, Sam reveals the information to Bran Stark, allowing the latter to piece together the truth that Jon Snow (the son of Rhaegar and Lyanna) is not a bastard, but a legitimate heir to the Iron Throne.  Gilly works with Davos Seaworth to prepare Winterfell's women and children to shelter in the crypts during the battle against the Army of the Dead.  Gilly survives the battle.  When Gilly and Sam leave Winterfell, Gilly is pregnant.

Recognition and awards

References 

A Song of Ice and Fire characters
Female characters in literature
Female characters in television
Literary characters introduced in 1998
Fictional teenage parents
Fictional offspring of incestuous relationships
Television characters introduced in 2012